A large number of places in the U.S were named after places in England largely as a result of English settlers and explorers of the Thirteen Colonies.

Some names were carried over directly and are found throughout the country (such as Manchester, Birmingham and Rochester). Others carry the prefix "New"; for example, the largest city in the US, New York, was named after York because King Charles II gave the land to his brother, James, the Duke of York (later James II). Some places, such as Hartford, Connecticut, bear an archaic spelling of an English place (in this case Hertford).

The American capital Washington, D.C. is named after the first U.S. President George Washington, whose surname was due to his family holding land in Washington, Tyne and Wear.

Alabama
 Ashford
 Avon
 Birmingham
 Brent
 Brighton
 Chelsea
 Leeds
 New London
 Oxford
 Sheffield
 Woodstock
 York

Alaska

 Anchorage

Arizona
 Avondale
 Chandler
 Douglas
 Winslow

Arkansas
 Benton
 Bradford 
 Camden 
 Chester 
 Carlisle 
 Dover 
 England 
 Everton
 Hampton
 Hartford
 Hatfield
 Haynes
 Lincoln (Named after Abraham Lincoln, whose last name originates from the city of Lincoln in England)
 London
 Mansfield
 Melbourne
 Newark
 Newcastle
 Oxford
 Shirley

California
 Brentwood
 Chatsworth
 Chester
 Compton
 Exeter
 Hanford
 Kensington
 Lancaster
 Manchester
 Newcastle
 Richmond
 Ryde
 Westminster
 Windsor

Colorado 
 Arlington
 Avon
 Brighton
 Bristol
 Hereford 
 Sedgwick
 Wellington
 Westminster
 Windsor
 Winter Park

Connecticut

 Andover
 Ashford
 Avon
 Berkshire
 Bolton
 Bristol
 Canterbury
 Cheshire
 Chester
 Chesterfield
 Colchester
 Colebrook
 Cornwall
 Coventry
 Danbury
 Derby
 Durham
 East Hampton
 East Windsor
 Easton
 Ellington
 Enfield
 Essex
 Farmington
 Glastonbury
 Granby
 Greenwich
 Guilford
 Hampton
 Hartford
 Kent
 Killingworth
 Litchfield
 Manchester
 Marlborough
 Meriden
 Middlesex County
 Milford
 New Britain
 New London
 Newington
 Norfolk
 Norwich
 Oxford
 Plymouth
 Portland
 Preston
 Salisbury
 Stafford
 Stamford
 Stratford
 Tolland
 Torrington
 Wallingford
 Waterford
 Weston
 Westport
 Willington
 Wilton
 Winchester
 Windsor
 Windsor Locks
 Woodstock

Delaware
 Arden
 Camden 
 Canterbury
 Dover
 Harrington
 Kent County 
 Lancashire
 Lewes 
 Lincoln
 Middletown
 Milford 
 Milton 
 Newark
 Seaford
 Sussex County
 Townsend
 Warwick
 Wilmington

Florida
 Avon Park
 Beverly Beach
 Bristol
 Davenport
 Fort Pierce
 Hillsboro Beach
 Layton
 Melbourne
 Plymouth
 Windermere
 Woodburn

Georgia
Bainbridge
Barwick
Boston
Chatsworth 
Claxton
Covington
Hull
Manchester 
Mansfield
Oxford
Preston
Putney
Warwick 
Washington
Winchester

Hawaii

Idaho
 Burley

Illinois
Birmingham Township
Chester
Chesterfield
Colchester
Cumberland County
Enfield
Hull
Huntley
Manchester
Truro Township
White Hall
Winchester
Woodstock

Indiana 
 Avon
 Bedford
 Bristol
 Carlisle
 Cumberland
 Darlington
 Manchester
 Manchester Township
 New Carlisle
 New London
 Oxford
 Plymouth 
 Washington
 Winchester
 Worthington

Iowa 
Abingdon
Ackworth
Alton
Bedford
Birmingham
Brighton
Cambridge
Carlisle 
Chatsworth
Chelsea
Cumberland
Derby
Dorchester 
Ely
Epworth
Essex
Hampton
Hartley
Hull 
Keswick
Leeds
Manchester
Matlock
New London
Otley 
Oxford
Radcliffe
Sheffield 
Stockport 
Washington
Waterloo

Kansas 
 Alton
 Bentley
 Berwick 
 Buxton
 Clayton
 Derby
 Devon
 Effingham
 Farlington
 Kensington
 Lancaster
 Lincoln
 Manchester
 Oxford
 Richmond
 Stafford 
 Wakefield
 Washington
 Westmoreland  
 Winchester

Kentucky 
 Birmingham
 Boston, Louisville
 Boston, Nelson County
 Bromley
 Cambridge
 Carlisle
 Cumberland County
 Cumberland Falls
 Cumberland Gap
 Cumberland Plateau
 Cumberland River 
 Dover
 Falmouth
 London
 Manchester
 Middlesboro
 Richmond
 Somerset
 Williba
 Winchester

Louisiana

Maine

 Acton
 Alton
 Andover
 Avon
 Bath
 Beddington
 Berwick
 Biddeford
 Boothbay
 Bradford
 Bristol
 Buxton
 Cambridge
 Chelsea
 Cumberland
 Cumberland County
 Durham
 Exeter
 Falmouth
 Harpswell
 Kittery
 Leeds
 Limington
 Manchester
 New Gloucester
 Oxford
 Portland
 Scarborough
 Waltham
 Wells
 Yarmouth
 York
 York County

Maryland

 Abingdon
 Barton
 Bristol
 Cambridge
 Cheltenham
 Chester
 Cumberland
 Essex
 Hampstead
 Hillsborough
 Kensington
 Kent
 Manchester
 Millington
 Nottingham
 Olney
 Oxford
 Salisbury
 Sunderland
 Warwick
 Westminster

Massachusetts

 Abington
 Acton
 Amesbury
 Andover
 Arlington
 Attleboro
 Avon
 Barnstable
 Bedford
 Berkley
 Beverly
 Billerica
 Blandford
 Bolton
 Boston
 Boxford
 Bradford
 Braintree
 Bridgewater
 Bridgewater (CDP)
 East Bridgewater
 West Bridgewater
 Brighton
 Brimfield
 Bristol
 Burlington (Bridlington)
 Cambridge
 Carlisle
 Chatham
 Chelmsford
 Chelsea
 Chester
 Chesterfield
 Chilmark
 Concord
 Dartmouth
 Dedham
 Dorchester
 Dover
 Dunstable
 Duxbury
 Duxbury (CDP)
 South Duxbury
 Essex
 Essex County
 Falmouth
 Falmouth (CDP)
 East Falmouth
 North Falmouth
 West Falmouth
 Framingham
 Gloucester
 Grafton
 Great Barrington
 Groton
 Hadley
 Halifax
 Harwich
 Hardwick
 Hatfield
 Haverhill
 Hingham
 Hingham (CDP)
 Hull
 Hyde Park
 Ipswich
 Islington
 Kingston
 Leeds
 Lancaster
 Leicester
 Leominster
 Lexington
 Lincoln
 Ludlow
 Lynn
 Malden
 Manchester
 Mansfield
 Marlborough
 Marshfield
 Medford
 Medway
 Middleborough
 Middlesex County
 Milford
 Milton
 Needham
 Newbury
 New Ashford
 New Bedford
 Newton
 Norfolk
 Norfolk County
 Northampton
 Norton
 Norwood
 Oakham
 Oxford
 Petersham
 Plymouth
 Plymouth Beach
 Plymouth Center
 Plymouth County
 North Plymouth
 South Plymouth 
 West Plymouth
 Plympton
 Raynham
 Reading
 Rochester
 Rowley
 Rutland
 Salisbury
 Sandwich
 Sheffield
 Shrewsbury
 Somerset
 Southampton
 Springfield
 Stockbridge
 Stoneham
 Stoughton
 Stow (Stowe)
 Sturbridge (Stourbridge)
 Sudbury
 Suffolk County
 Sunderland
 Sutton
 Taunton
 Templeton
 Tewksbury
 Tisbury
 West Tisbury
 Topsfield
 Truro
 North Truro
 Upton
 Uxbridge
 Wakefield
 Waltham
 Wareham
 Wareham Center
 West Wareham
 Warwick
 Westfield
 Westport
 Westwood
 Weymouth
 Wilbraham
 Winchester
 Windsor
 Woburn
 Worcester
 Wrentham 
 Yarmouth

Michigan

 Avon
 Berkley 
 Birmingham
 Brighton
 Camden
 Chelsea
 Chesterfield
 Elmhurst
 Farmington
 Kensington
 Kent County
 Lincoln
 Manchester
 Milford
 New Boston
 New Haven
 Oxford
 Plymouth
 Richmond
 Rochester
 Rothbury
 Somerset Township
 Surrey Township
 Warren
 Washington Township
 Waterford

Minnesota

 Stearns county
 Bradford
 Bristol Township
 Ely
 Kensington
 Kent
 London
 London Township
 Manchester
 New Brighton
 New London
 Plymouth
 Rochester

Mississippi
 Bolton
 Bude
 Oxford
 Plymouth
 Suffolk

Missouri
 Alton
 Birmingham
 Bosworth
 Brentwood 
 Chesterfield
 Clayton
 Essex
 Everton
 Farmington
 Lancaster
 Lincoln
 Manchester
 Mansfield
 New London 
 Plymouth
 Salisbury
 Shrewsbury
 Stockton
 Washington 
 Weatherby
 Wellington
 Winchester
 Windsor 
 Worthington

Montana
 Billings

Nebraska
 Amherst
 Burwell
 Cambridge
 Crawford
 Crofton
 Danbury
 Exeter
 Hartington
 Hastings
 Hampton
 Lancaster County
 Lincoln
 Lexington
 London
 Oxford
 Sutton
 Wakefield
 Washington
 Weston
 York

Nevada
 Ely

New Hampshire

 New Hampshire — named after Hampshire by governor John Mason.
 Alton
 Andover
 Barrington
 Bath
 Bedford
 Bradford
 Brentwood
 Bridgewater
 Bristol
 Canterbury
 Chatham
 Chesham
 Chester
 Chichester
 Concord
 Croydon
 Derry
 Dorchester
 Dover
 Durham
 Epping
 Epsom
 Exeter
 Hampstead
 Hampton
 Kensington
 Lancaster
 Lincoln
 Litchfield
 Londonderry
 Lyme
 Manchester
 Marlborough
 Marlow
 New Castle
 New Ipswich
 New London
 Newington
 Newmarket
 Northumberland
 Nottingham
 Plaistow
 Portsmouth
 Richmond
 Rochester
 Rye
 Sandown
 Stratham (from Streatham)
 Strafford (from Stratford)
 Surry (from Surrey)
 Tamworth
 Wakefield
 Westmoreland
 Wilton
 Woodstock

New Jersey

 New Jersey itself
 Barrington
 Bedminster
 Birmingham
 Bloomsbury
 Bridgewater
 Camden, New Jersey
 Chester
 Clifton
 Cumberland County
 Dover
 Essex County
 Evesham Township
 Gloucester City
 Gloucester County
 Gloucester Township
 Greenwich
 Lyndhurst
 Manchester
 Margate City
 Middlesex
 Middlesex County
 Newark
 Ridgewood
 Ringwood
 Shrewsbury
 Shrewsbury Township
 Southampton
 Stockton
 Stafford Township
 Stratford
 Somerset
 Somerset County
 Sussex
 Sussex County
 Ventnor
 Washington
 Weymouth
 Woodbury
 Woolwich

New Mexico 
 Clayton
 Farmington

New York

 New York itself
 Albany county
 Allerton
 Andover
 Ardsley
 Bath
 Bedford
 Bedford Hills
 Boston
 Bradford
 Brentwood
 Bridgehampton
 Bridgewater (town)
 Bridgewater (village)
 Brighton, Erie County
 Brighton, Franklin County
 Brighton, Monroe County
 Brighton Beach
 Bristol 
 Calverton
 Cambridge
 Carlisle
 Chatham
 Chelsea
 Chester, Orange County
 Chester, Warren County
 Chesterfield
 Chichester
 Colchester
 Cornwall
 Cornwall-on-Hudson
 Coventry
 Cumberland County
 Durham
 Elmhurst, Chautauqua County
 Elmhurst, Queens
 Essex
 Fordham
 Garden City
 Gravesend
 Greenwich
 Greenwich Village
 Hastings-on-Hudson
 Hempstead (town)
 Hempstead (village)
 Huntington (CDP)
 Huntington (town)
 Hyde Park
 Islip (CDP)
 Islip (town)
 Kensington, Nassau County
 Kensington, Brooklyn
 Kew Gardens
 Kingsbridge
 Kingston
 Lancaster
 Leeds
 Leicester
 Lincoln
 Liverpool
 Manchester
 Middlesex
 New Brighton
 New Castle
 New Hartford
 New Hyde Park
 New Suffolk
 New Windsor
 New York City
 Norfolk
 Northampton, Fulton County
 Northampton, Suffolk County
 Northumberland
 Norwich
 Oxford
 Plymouth
 Reading
 Ridge
 Riverhead (CDP)
 Riverhead (town)
 Rochdale
 Rochester
 Roxbury
 Rutland
 Rye
 Salisbury 
 St. Albans
 Scarborough
 Scarsdale
 Seaford
 Shoreham
 Somerset
 Southampton
 South Bristol
 Southold (CDP)
 Southold (town)
 Springfield
 Stafford
 Stamford
 Stamford (village)
 Suffolk County
 Upton
 Wainscott
 Warwick
 Warwick (village)
 Waterloo (town)
 Waterloo (village)
 West Brighton
 Windsor
 Woodbury, Nassau County
 Woodbury, Orange County
 Woodstock
 Worcester
 York
 Yorkshire
 Yorktown

North Carolina
 Bath
 Burlington
 Camden
 Camden County
 Chatham County
 Cumberland County
 Dalton
 Danbury
 Durham
 Enfield
 Guilford County
 Hertford
 Hertford County
 Hillsborough
 Leicester
 Lincoln County
 Macclesfield
 Middlesex
 Mount Pleasant
 New London
 Oxford
 Plymouth
 Raleigh
 Richmond County
 Rockingham
 Salisbury
 Southport
 Surry (Surrey)
 Wentworth
 Warrenton (Warrington, Cheshire)
 Wilmington

North Dakota
 Berwick
 Harlow
 Leeds
 New England
 Norwich
 Rugby
 Surrey
 Tunbridge
 Warwick
 Watford City
 York

Ohio

 Amberley
 Andover
 Avon
 Avon Lake
 Bath, Allen County
 Bath, Greene County
 Bath, Summit County
 Bedford
 Bedford Heights
 Berwick
 Bexley
 Birmingham, Erie County
 Birmingham, Guernsey County
 Bradford
 Brighton
 Bristol
 Camden
 Carlisle
 Cheshire
 Chatham
 Chester
 Cleveland
 Coventry
 Cumberland
 Derby
 Dorset
 Dover
  
Dover Township, Athens County
 Dover Township, Fulton County
 Dover Township, Tuscarawas County
 Dover Township, Union County
 Durham Township
 East Liverpool
 Essex
 Grafton
 Greenwich
 Guilford
 Kensington
 Kettering
 Litchfield
 Liverpool Township, Medina County
 Liverpool Township, Columbiana County
 London
 New Carlisle
 New London
 Lyme
 Malvern
 Manchester
 Mansfield
 Mayfield
 Mayfield Heights
 New Lyme Township
 Nottingham Township
 Norwich
 Oxford
 Plymouth
 Portsmouth
 Reading
 Rochester Township
 Salisbury
 Sheffield
 Somerset
 Truro Township
 Windsor
 York Township

Oklahoma
 Blackburn
 Chelsea
 Manchester (disputed; see footnote)
 Newcastle
 Warwick

Oregon

Pennsylvania

 Alden (derived from Alden Valley, Lancashire)
 Andreas (from Andreas, Isle of Man)
 Aston 
 Barnsley
 Bath
 Bedford
 Bedminster
 Berks County (short for "Berkshire")
 Berwick
 Birmingham, Chester County
 Birmingham, Huntingdon County
 Black Heath (derived from either Blackheath, London or Blackheath, West Midlands)
 Brentwood
 Brighton
 Bristol
 Bristol Township
 Buckingham
 Bucks County (short for "Buckinghamshire")
 Carlisle
 Cheltenham
 Cheltenham Township
 Chester
 Cheswick
 Croydon
 Cumberland County
 Darby (from the phonetic pronunciation of "Derby")
 Darlington
 Devon
 Dover
 Easton (derived from Easton Neston, a estate in Northamptonshire)
 East Huntingdon Township
 East York
 Elmhurst
 Emsworth
 Exeter
 Essington
 Falmouth
 Freeland
 Grantham
 Halifax
 Hereford
 Hereford Township
 Horsham
 Huntingdon
 Huntington
 Hyde Park
 Kensington
 Kidder Township (derived from Kidderminster, Worcestershire)
 Kingston
 Lancaster
 Lancaster County
 Lancaster Township, Butler County
 Lancaster Township, Lancaster County
 Liverpool
 Liverpool Township
 Lowhill Township (derived from Low Hill, Wolverhampton, West Midlands)
 Lynn Township (derived from King's Lynn, Norfolk)
 Malvern
 Manchester
 Mayfair
 Middlesex Township
 New Brighton
 New Castle 
 New Cumberland
 New Kensington
 New London
 New Oxford
 New Stanton
 New Wilmington
 Northampton
 Northampton County
 Northumberland
 Northumberland County
 Norwood
 Nottingham
 Nottingham Township
 Olney
 Oxford
 Plymouth
 Reading
 Richmond Township
 Rochester
 Romney
 Salisbury Township
 Sheffield
 Shrewsbury
 Somerset
 Southampton
 Southwark
 South Huntingdon Township
 Sunbury (derived from Sunbury-on-Thames, Surrey)
 Telford
 Trafford
 Warminster
 Warrington
 Warwick Township, Bucks County
 Warwick Township, Chester County
 Warwick Township, Lancaster County
 Washington
 Westmoreland County
 Whitehall
 Yeadon
 York

Rhode Island

 Barrington
 Bradford
 Bristol
 Bristol County
 Coventry
 Cumberland
 East Greenwich
 Exeter
 Elmhurst
 Gloucester
 Kent County
 Lincoln
 Little Compton
 New Shoreham
 Portsmouth
 Smithfield
 Tiverton
 Warren
 Warwick
 West Greenwich
 West Warwick
 Westerly
 Wickford

South Carolina
 Barnwell
 Camden
 Carlisle
 Chesterfield 
 Darlington
 Effingham
 Hampton
 Lancaster
 Westminster
 Windsor
 York

South Dakota
 Andover
 Arlington
 Avon 
 Bath
 Brentford
 Bristol
 Chelsea
 Chester
 Hereford
 Ipswich 
 Manchester 
 Mansfield 
 Oldham
 Rutland
 Selby
 Wentworth
 Worthing

Tennessee
 Bradford
 Bransford
 Brentwood
 Bristol
 Cumberland County
 Fairfield Glade (derived from Fairfield, Bedfordshire)
 Harrogate
 Huntingdon
 London
 Manchester
 Portland
 Springfield
 Westmoreland
 Winchester
 Woodbury

Texas

 Bedford
 Bristol
 Caldwell
 Derby 
 Hereford
 Liverpool
 London
 Mansfield
 Newcastle
 Richmond      
 Sheffield
 Southampton
 Stamford 
 Wellington 
 Wortham
Irving

Utah
 Croydon
 Leamington, Utah
 Leeds

Vermont

 Andover
 Barnet
 Berkshire
 Bradford
 Brighton
 Bridgewater
 Bristol
 Burlington
 Cambridge
 Chelsea
 Chester
 Chittenden
 Colchester
 Coventry
 Cumberland County
 Derby
 Derby Center
 Derby Line
 Essex
 Essex County
 Guilford
 Kirby
 Leicester
 Maidstone
 Manchester
 Milton
 Norwich
 Middlesex
 Plymouth
 Putney
 Reading
 Richmond
 Rochester
 Rutland
 Salisbury
 Sheffield
 Shrewsbury
 St Albans
 Stamford
 Stockbridge
 Stowe
 Sudbury
 Tunbridge
 Wells
 Weybridge
 Westminster
 Windham County
 Woodstock

Virginia

 Abingdon
 Arlington
 Ashland
 Bedford
 Bristol
 Charles City County
 Chester
 Chesterfield
 Crewe
 Cumberland County
 Cumberland Mountains
 Dendron
 Dover
 Elmhurst
 Essex County, Virginia
 Falmouth
 Gloucester
 Gloucester County
 Gloucester Courthouse
 Gloucester Point
 Hampton
 Loudoun County
 Manchester
 Manchester, Chesterfield County
 Midlothian
 New Kent
 Norfolk
 Northumberland County
 Prince William County
 Richmond
 Shadwell
 Southampton
 Stafford
 Suffolk
 Sussex County
 Portsmouth
 Surry
 Isle of Wight County
 Northampton County
 Northumberland County
 Middlesex County
 Sussex
 Buckingham
 Wakefield
 Waverly
 Westmoreland County
 Woodstock
 Winchester
 Yorkshire
 Yorktown

Washington
 The state itself is named after the first U.S. President, George Washington, whose surname was due to his family owning Washington Old Hall and land in Washington, Tyne and Wear.
 Bellingham
 Covington
 Darrington
 Harrington
 Hatton
 Hamilton
 Kelso, Washington
 Kent
 Langley
 Malden
 Manchester
 Mansfield
 Matlock
 Newcastle
 Waverly
 Winthrop

West Virginia
 Chester
 Elmhurst
 New Cumberland
 New Manchester
 London
 Romney
 St. Albans

Wisconsin

 Appleton
 Bradford
 Bristol, Dane County
 Bristol, Kenosha County
 Cambridge
 Cumberland
 Dorchester
 Gillingham
 Hull, Marathon County
 Hull, Portage County
 Ipswich
 Lancaster
 Leeds
 Manchester, Green Lake County
 Manchester, Jackson County
 Middleton
 New Chester
 New London
 Oxford
 Plymouth
 Plymouth, Juneau County
 Plymouth, Rock County
 Plymouth, Sheboygan County
 Ripon
 Somerset
 Stoughton
 Sussex
 Waterloo
 Wellington

Wyoming
 Bedford
 Newcastle
 Sussex

Other
 New England

See also
 Anglo-America
 British colonization of the Americas
 List of places named after places in the United States
 List of non-US places that have a US place named after them

References

Names
United States
English
English
English
English language in the United States